Jorge Frias de Paula (November 1906 – 2 January 1979) was an Olympic backstroke swimmer from Brazil, who participated at one Summer Olympics for his native country. He was born in Rio de Janeiro. At the 1932 Summer Olympics in Los Angeles, he swam the 100-metre backstroke, not reaching the finals.

References

1906 births
1979 deaths
Brazilian male backstroke swimmers
Swimmers at the 1932 Summer Olympics
Olympic swimmers of Brazil
Swimmers from Rio de Janeiro (city)
20th-century Brazilian people